The 1956–57 season was the 65th season in Liverpool F.C.'s existence, and was their third consecutive year in the Second Division. For the second consecutive year, the club finished third in the table, just one point outside the automatic promotion places.

Squad

Goalkeepers
 Doug Rudham
 Tommy Younger

Defenders
 Don Campbell
 Laurie Hughes
 John Molyneux
 Ronnie Moran
 Tom McNulty
 Fred Perry
 John Price
 Geoff Twentyman
 Dick White

Midfielders
 Alan A'Court
 Brian Jackson
 Roy Saunders
 Barry Wilkinson

Forwards
 Alan Arnell
 Louis Bimpson
 Joe Dickson
 John Evans
 Billy Liddell
 Jimmy Melia
 Tony Rowley
 Johnny Wheeler

Table

Results

Second Division

FA Cup

References
 LFC History.net – 1956-57 season
 Liverweb - 1956-57 Season

Liverpool F.C. seasons
Liverpool